Minister of Justice and Constitutional Development v Prince  is a decision of the Constitutional Court of South Africa delivered on 18 September 2018, which found that it is unconstitutional for the state to criminalize the possession, use or cultivation of cannabis by adults for personal consumption in private. The court gave Parliament 24 months to amend the affected legislation, but also granted interim relief which had the effect of immediately making it legal for adults to use cannabis in private, possess cannabis in private for personal use, and cultivate cannabis in a private place for personal consumption.

References

External links
 Text of the judgment

2018 in case law
2018 in South African law
2018 cannabis law reform
Cannabis in South Africa
Constitutional Court of South Africa cases